Chris Langemeier  was a member of the Nebraska Legislature in the United States.

Personal life
He was born in Schuyler, Nebraska and graduated from Schuyler Central High School and the University of Nebraska-Lincoln.  He held many positions in the Lower Platte North Natural Resources District.  He is a real estate broker.

State legislature
He was elected in 2004 to represent the 23rd Nebraska legislative district.  He served as the chairman of the Natural Resources committee and was a member of the Banking, Commerce and Insurance committee; the Executive Board of the Legislative Council; and the Intergovernmental Cooperation committee.

References
 

Living people
Republican Party Nebraska state senators
University of Nebraska–Lincoln alumni
People from Schuyler, Nebraska
Year of birth missing (living people)